Prince Ivane Andronikashvili, also known as Knyaz Ivan Malkhazovich Andronnikov (1798 – November 19, 1868) was a Georgian nobleman and general in the Imperial Russian service.

He was born in Qudaghlo in the Kingdom of Kartli and Kakheti to Prince Malkhaz Andronikashvili and Princess Mariam Bagrationi. (In 1801, the Kingdom of Kartli and Kakheti became part of the Russian Empire.) His mother, Princess Mariam Bagrationi, was the sister of the last Imeretian king Solomon II. He himself was married to Princess Nino Imeretinsky, granddaughter of King David II of Imereti.

When Andronikashvili turned nineteen, he was enrolled in the St Petersburg Cavalry Regiment of the Leib Guard. Seven years later he was transferred to the Nizhny Novgorod cavalry regiment with the rank of major. When the Russo-Persian war broke out in 1826 Andronikashvili became heavily involved in many decisive battles.  He served later in the Caucasus during the wars with Persia (1826-1829) and Turkey (1828-1829). He was promoted Major General in 1841 and appointed Governor General of Tiflis in 1849. He took part in the Caucasian War and led an expedition against the rebellious Ossetes in 1840 and 1850.

The Crimean War was the apex of Andronikashvili’s military career. On November 14, 1853, he defeated Ali Pasha's army of 20,000 men at Akhaltsikhe with as few as 5,000 soldiers, mostly irregular Georgian cavalrymen. He achieved another victory against considerable odds over Selim Pasha’s 36,000 troops at the Choloki River with the force of 13,000. Prince Andronikashvili was promoted to General of Cavalry just a few months before his death in 1868.

Honours and awards
 Order of St. Vladimir, 4th class (1826),
 Order of St. Anna, 2nd class (1827)
 Order of St. George, 4th class (1830) and 3rd class (1853)
 Order of St. Stanislaus 1st class (1847)
 Order of St. Alexander Nevsky (1854)

See also
Andronikashvili

References

External links 

  Russian Biographical Dictionary

1798 births
1868 deaths
Nobility of Georgia (country)
Military personnel from Georgia (country)
Russian military personnel of the Crimean War
Imperial Russian Army generals
Georgian generals in the Imperial Russian Army
Georgian generals with the rank "General of the Cavalry" (Imperial Russia)
Generals from Georgia (country)
Ivane
Recipients of the Order of Saint Stanislaus (Russian), 1st class
Recipients of the Order of St. Vladimir, 4th class
Recipients of the Order of St. George of the Third Degree
Recipients of the Order of St. Anna, 2nd class
Russian military personnel of the Caucasian War
People of the Russo-Persian Wars
People of the Caucasian War